The Pekin Lettes is a fast-pitch softball team in Pekin, Illinois, and is the oldest member-sanctioned Amateur Softball Association team in the United States.

History
The Lettes were started in 1936 and were then called the "Caterpillar Girls" because the team was sponsored by and composed of women from Caterpillar Tractor Company in nearby East Peoria.  They became the Caterpillar Dieselettes in 1940, the Sunnyland Lettes in 1956, and the Pekin Lettes in 1959.  In the late 1950s and early 1960s the Lettes average attendance-per-season was over 100,000, with thousands of spectators attending each game.  The 1963 season averaged over 5,000 fans per game, setting a national ASA attendance record of 122,000 for 21 home games.  In 2005, the Pekin Lettes team was inducted into the ASA Hall of Fame.

Field
The Lettes play home games at Pekin's Mineral Springs Park.  The Pekin Park District renamed "Diamond 1", the historic playing field of the Lettes, "Lettes Field" in 2002.

Records
Illinois State Championships: 1940, 1942–1955, 1957, 1969, 1977–79, 1991
ASA National Tournament: 1959 (7th place), 1960 (4th place), 1961 (4th place), 1965 (3rd place), 1966 (7th place), 1970 (5th place), 1971 (7th place)

Legends
ASA Women's Fastpitch First Team All-Americans prior to 1990
 Gloria Bonelli (1950)
 Marie Wadlow (1950)
 Carolyn (Hart) Thome (1950–1952, 1959)
 Shirley Coney (1950, 1951)
 Sunne Bea Thomas (1960)
 Lorene Ramsey (1960, 1965)
 Ann Mullins (1965, 1970)
 Kelly Waldrup (1986)
 Wendy Smith (1986)
 Leanne Bonifas (1987)
 Linda Wells (1988)
 Margie Wright (1988)

Sources

 Peoria Journal Star
 Pekin Lettes homepage

External links
 Pekin Lettes Homepage
 Amateur Softball Association

East Peoria, Illinois 
Lettes
Softball teams in Illinois
Sports clubs established in 1936
Tazewell County, Illinois
Caterpillar Inc.
1936 establishments in Illinois